SH 1040 or SH-1040 may refer to the following:
Gestaclone, a developmental code name for a steroidal progestin
List of highways numbered 1040, a list of routes or highways that are numbered 1040